Once Upon a Time in China and America, also known as Once Upon a Time in China VI, (Chinese: 黃飛鴻之西域雄獅) is a 1997 Hong Kong martial arts western film  directed by Sammo Hung in his last directorial effort until 2016, who also worked on the film's fight choreography. The film is the sixth and final installment in the Once Upon a Time in China film series. It also saw the return of Jet Li as Cantonese martial arts master and folk hero Wong Fei-hung, who had been replaced by Vincent Zhao in the fourth and fifth films. The film was released in Hong Kong on 1 February 1997 and garnered positive reviews.

Plot
The film is set in the early 20th century. Wong Fei-hung, along with his romantic interest 13th Aunt and apprentice Clubfoot, travels from China to America to visit another of his apprentices, "Bucktooth" So, who has recently opened a branch of Po-chi-lam, Wong's traditional Chinese medicine clinic, in San Francisco. While travelling by carriage across the wilderness, they pick up a friendly cowboy, Billy, who is almost dying of thirst. When the party stops to have lunch, a bunch of hostile Native Americans ambush them. Although Wong, 13th Aunt and Clubfoot escape unharmed, their carriage is destroyed. 13th Aunt and Clubfoot are rescued and taken to "Bucktooth" So's clinic. Wong, however, hits his head on a rock and loses his memory as a consequence. He is saved by another Native American tribe.

In San Francisco, Billy tries to stop the corrupt mayor from imposing discriminatory laws to make life difficult for the Chinese migrants. Meanwhile, the Native American tribe that saved Wong gets into trouble with a more powerful rival tribe. The chief's son, Fierce Eagle, is injured by the rival tribe's leader. To everyone's surprise, Wong defeats the rival tribe's leader and half of his men, causing the rival tribe to flee in fear. He eventually makes his way to San Francisco and regains his memory with the help of his companions, but forgets everything that happened during his bout of amnesia.

In the meantime, the mayor has fallen into debt so he hires a Mexican bandit to help him rob the bank and frames the people in Po-chi-lam for the robbery while he secretly plans to abscond with the loot. Wong and his companions are arrested and sentenced to death by hanging. Just then, the Mexican bandit discovers that the mayor has paid him less than he expects so he returns to claim his money, thus revealing the truth. In the ensuing fight, the mayor is killed and Wong manages to capture the bandit and clear Po-chi-lam's name. At the end of the film, Billy is elected as the new mayor while Wong, 13th Aunt and Clubfoot return to China.

Cast
Jet Li as Wong Fei-hung
Rosamund Kwan as "13th Aunt" Yee Siu-kwan
Hung Yan-yan as Kwai Geuk-chat ("Clubfoot Seven Chiu-Tsat")
Power Chan as So Sai-man ("Bucktooth" So)
Jeff Wolfe as Billy
Joe Sayah as Mexican bandit
Richard Ng as Uncle Han
Lau Kar-wing as Lion Dance Drummer
T. J. Storm as Rival Tribe Indian Brave
Mars (extra) (uncredited)
Patrick Lung as Uncle Lung
Deborah Kay Hooker "Mum"
Ron Ring
Ryon Marshall
Freddy Joe
Chrysta Bell as Sarah
William Fung as Immigrant worker
Johnny Koo as Immigrant worker
Jerry Wu as Opium Den worker
Alan Chanas
Wong Choh-wa
Fan Chin-hung
Choi Kwok-keung
Jason De Hoyos as Fierce Eagle
Daniel Lujan as Flying Eagle
Roberto Lopez as Mexican (Gang of seven )

Production
The film was shot at the Alamo Village, the film set originally created for John Wayne's The Alamo and other locations in South Texas. Lau Kar-wing served as the film's assistant and second unit director.

Awards and nominations

Box office
Jet Li's return to the series - and, in all likelihood, the final installment of the franchise - opened on the weekend of Chinese New Year, and faced stiff competition from director Hung's own film, Mr. Nice Guy. Still, it grossed HK$30,268,415 at the Hong Kong box office.

Mandarin version

A sync-sound Mandarin soundtrack features a number of the Chinese actors speaking their own language (including Jet Li, Patrick Lung - Richard Ng speaks Cantonese however), whilst others are dubbed.

References

External links

HKMDB
HK Cinemagic

1997 films
1997 martial arts films
1990s biographical films
1997 Western (genre) films
Hong Kong biographical films
Hong Kong martial arts films
Hong Kong sequel films
1990s Cantonese-language films
China Star Entertainment Group films
Films shot in California
Films shot in Texas
Kung fu films
Once Upon a Time in China (film series)
Films directed by Sammo Hung
1990s Hong Kong films